Kobuleti is a town in Adjara, western Georgia, situated on the eastern coast of the Black Sea. It is the seat of Kobuleti Municipality and a seaside resort, visited annually by Georgians and many former Soviet Union residents. It is especially popular with Armenian tourists. It was known as Çürüksu  during Ottoman rule.

Geography

The town is situated in the south-western part of Georgia, i.e. the northern part of the Autonomous Republic of Ajara. It borders with Ozurgeti Region to the north. The Regional centre is Kobuleti City, which stretches along the Black Sea shore.

After the civil wars of 1990-1993, the once sophisticated sanatoriums remained abandoned and plundered until 2004. In the meantime Kobuleti has developed into an upscale tourist center again.

Kobuleti Region consists of one municipal, two district and seventeen village councils. There are 48 villages in the region. Representatives of 24 different nationalities live together with Georgians in the region. Kobuleti is known with its traditions, hospitality, climatic areas, mild subtropical climate, ionized maritime air, bright shining sun and warm sea. The unique sandy beach widely inclined to the sea is noted with its marvelous views beautified by sky-scraped endemic pine trees, eucalypts, bamboo, cypress grove, date and cocoa palms.

Climate

Nature
The Kintrishi and Tikeri reserve areas are unique with their bio-diversity. One can find rare flora in the Ispani marsh.

The surrounding region has diverse soil: seashore lowland is rich in peatbog soil. There are alpine rocks in the highlands, red soil is found in the hill areas. The mountainous area is good for subtropical species.

Kobuleti has several rivers. The most important ones are the Kintrishi River, the Chakvistskali River, the Acharistskali River, the Ochkhamuri River, the Achkva River, and the Dekhva River.

Kintrishi Protected Landscape and Kobuleti Managed Reserve are located in Kobuleti.

Notable people
 Nino Katamadze, singer and composer
 Kakhaber Mzhavanadze, footballer
 Jano Ananidze, footballer
 Revaz Chelebadze, footballer
 Çürüksulu Mahmud Pasha, Ottoman general and politician

See also
 Adjara
 Batumi

References

External links

Cities and towns in Adjara
Archaeological sites in Georgia (country)
Populated places in Kobuleti Municipality
Populated coastal places in Georgia (country)